Przemysław Gabriel Bargiel (born 26 March 2000) is a Polish professional footballer who plays as a midfielder for Śląsk Wrocław II.

Club career

Ruch Chorzów
Bargiel started his football career in the youth teams of Ruch Chorzów. On 29 April 2016, aged 16, he made his professional debut for the club in an Ekstraklasa game against Cracovia, which Ruch lost 1–0. He went on to make a total of 5 appearances over the remainder of that season and the following one.

AC Milan
On 10 August 2017, he moved to Italian Serie A side AC Milan, for a reported fee of €350k, plus a further €150k of possible bonus payment.

Spezia
On 19 August 2018, Bargiel was sent out to Serie B club Spezia on a season-long loan.

Śląsk Wrocław
On 2 September 2019, Bargiel transferred back to Poland, signing a four-year deal with Śląsk Wrocław.

References

External links
 
 

2000 births
Sportspeople from Ruda Śląska
Living people
Polish footballers
Poland youth international footballers
Association football midfielders
Ruch Chorzów players
Śląsk Wrocław players
Ekstraklasa players
II liga players
III liga players
Polish expatriates in Italy
Expatriate footballers in Italy